The 2004 Kentucky Derby was the 130th running of the Kentucky Derby. The race took place on May 1, 2004 and was won by Smarty Jones, who earned a $5 million bonus. There were 140,054 in attendance.

Contenders
Smarty Jones was the 4-1 favorite for the race. He came into the Derby with an undefeated record, including wins in the Rebel Stakes and Arkansas Derby, both held at Oaklawn Park. If he won the Kentucky Derby, he stood to earn a $5 million "Centennial Bonus" offered by Oaklawn to celebrate its 100th anniversary.

His leading rivals included Lion Heart (Hollywood Futurity, 2nd in Blue Grass Stakes), Castledale (Santa Anita Derby), The Cliff's Edge (Blue Grass Stakes), Tapit (Wood Memorial), Friends Lake (Florida Dery), and Imperialism (San Rafael, 2nd in Santa Anita Derby).

St. Averil and Wimbledon were originally entered but scratched from the race, meaning there were only 18 starters.

Full results
A "deluge" started about two hours before the race, turning a fast track sloppy. Lion Heart, breaking near the rail, ran a quick opening quarter mile of 22.99 seconds to get good position going into the first turn. His jockey Mike Smith then started to slow down the pace, completing the half mile in 46.73 and three-quarters in 1:11.80. Smarty Jones rated a few lengths behind then started his move on the far turn. The two raced heads apart as they entered the stretch, then Smarty Jones started to edge away to win by  lengths.

Smarty Jones became the first horse to win the Derby while undefeated since Seattle Slew in 1977. It was the first Derby win for his trainer, jockey and owner, all of whom were well known in the Mid Atlantic racing circuit but making their first start in the race. His 77-year-old owner Roy Chapman also bred the colt at Someday Farm in Pennsylvania. Chapman and his wife Patricia had owned and bred many horses over the years, but none had raced at the highest level. "We had a lot of ham-and-eggers," he said, "but sometimes you can cheer just as loud and get just as excited about winning a $10,000 claimer as a stakes. But we never raced at this level until Smarty came along. To have bred him and had him born on your farm, it's something... He is from Philly and I'm very proud of everything he's done."

 Smarty Jones earnings included a $5 million racing series bonus

Track condition: Fast

Times:  mile – 22.99;  mile – 46.73;  mile – 1:11.80; mile – 1:37.35; final – 2:04.06.
Splits for each quarter-mile: (22.99) (23.74) (25.07) (25.55) (26.71)

Source: Equibase Chart

Payout
The 130th Kentucky Derby Payout Schedule

 $2 Exacta: (15-3)  Paid   $65.20
 $2 Trifecta: (15-3-10)  Paid   $987.60
 $2 Superfecta: (15-3-10-1)  Paid   $41,380.20

Subsequent racing careers
Several horses went on to win Grade I races:
 Smarty Jones – Preakness Stakes
 Lion Heart – Haskell Invitational
 Birdstone – Belmont Stakes, Travers Stakes
 Borrego – 2005 Pacific Classic, Jockey Club Gold Cup
 Castledale – 2005 Shoemaker Mile

Subsequent breeding careers
Sires of Classic winners 

Tapit – leading sire in North America 2014-2016
 Tonalist – 2014 Belmont Stakes, Jockey Club Gold Cup, 2015 Cigar Mile, Jockey Club Gold Cup
 Creator – 2016 Belmont Stakes, Arkansas Derby
 Tapwrit – 2017 Belmont Stakes
 Untapable – 2014 Kentucky Oaks, Mother Goose Stakes, Cotillion, Breeders' Cup Distaff, 2015 Apple Blossom
 Frosted – 2015 Wood Memorial, 2016 Metropolitan Handicap, Whitney Stakes

Birdstone
 Mine That Bird – 2009 Kentucky Derby
 Summer Bird – 2009 Belmont Stakes, Travers Stakes, Jockey Club Gold Cup
 Noble Bird – 2015 Stephen Foster Handicap

Pollard's Vision
 Blind Luck – 2010 Kentucky Oaks, Las Virgenes Stakes, Alabama Stakes, 2009 Oak Leaf Stakes, Hollywood Starlet, 2011 Vanity Handicap

Sires of Grade I winners 
Lion Heart
 Dangerous Midge – 2010 Breeders' Cup Turf
 Lion of David – 2010 Arkansas Derby
 Bradester – 2016 Stephen Foster Handicap
 Tom's Tribute – 2014 Eddie Read Stakes

Imperialism
 Imperial Hint – 2017 and 2018 Alfred G. Vandebilt, Vosburgh

Read the Footnotes
 Rightly So – 2010 Ballerina Stakes

Sources: American Classic Pedigrees, Equibase, Blood-Horse Stallion Register, Racing Post

References

2004
Kentucky Derby
Derby
May 2004 sports events in the United States